Rhododendron glischrum (粘毛杜鹃) is a species of flowering plant in the family Ericaceae. The flowers are pink with purple flecks and basal blotch.

References

Sources
 I. B. Balfour & W. W. Smith, Notes Roy. Bot. Gard. Edinburgh. 9: 229. 1916.

glischrum
Taxa named by Isaac Bayley Balfour
Taxa named by William Wright Smith